Baptism of Christ is a 1643 painting by Jusepe de Ribera. Since 1881 it has been in the Museum of Fine Arts in Nancy.

External links
Alfonso E. Pérez Sánchez, Nicola Spinosa, Jusepe de Ribera, 1591-1652, Metropolitan Museum of Art, 1992 pp. 149–51
Clara Gelly, Nancy, Musée des beaux-arts: peintures italiennes et espagnoles, XIVe-XIXe siècle, IAC Éditions, 2006 p. 140
http://books.google.nl/books?id=h_pQSwFmcZkC&dq
http://books.google.nl/books?id=yIOJgJEw8FUC&dq

1643 paintings
Paintings by Jusepe de Ribera
Ribera